Martin Crowe (21 June 1923 – 3 July 2011) was an Australian athlete. He competed in the men's hammer throw at the 1956 Summer Olympics.

References

1923 births
2011 deaths
Athletes (track and field) at the 1956 Summer Olympics
Australian male hammer throwers
Olympic athletes of Australia
Sportspeople from Ballarat